This article lists results for French association football team Nîmes Olympique in European competition.

Participations
As of 4 December 2012, Nîmes have competed in:
1 participation in the UEFA Cup Winners' Cup
2 participations in the UEFA Cup / UEFA Europa League

Record by competition
As of 4 December 2012

Matches in Europe

References

 UEFA European Cup Matches - Olympique Nîmes

Europe
French football clubs in international competitions